Henry Bertholf "Spike" Robinson (January 16, 1930 – October 29, 2001) was a jazz tenor saxophonist. He began playing at age twelve, recording on several labels, including Discovery, Hep and Concord. However, he sought an engineering degree and followed that profession for nearly 30 years. In 1981 he returned to recording music.

Early life
Robinson was born in Kenosha, Wisconsin on January 16, 1930. Beginning on alto saxophone in his early years, Robinson soon discovered that it was hard to make a living playing the kind of music he wanted to play.

Later life and career
In 1948, Robinson joined the US Navy as a musician and by 1950 was based in the UK. He was soon regularly jamming at London's Club Eleven, Downbeat Club and Studio 51 with leading UK beboppers, including Tommy Pollard, Johnny Dankworth and Victor Feldman. He made a few records for Carlo Krahmer's Esquire label but eventually was transferred home and demobilized. Unhappy with the music scene in the Chicago area, he took advantage of the G.I. Bill to study electronic engineering at university.

For most of the next 30 years he lived and worked in Colorado, eventually taking up music again, this time playing tenor saxophone and working nights at local clubs. A constant musical companion of these times was Dave Grusin. In 1981, Robinson recorded for the first time since his London sessions, which also featured pianist Victor Feldman and bassist Ray Brown. His album was Spike Robinson Plays Harry Warren. Encouraged to visit the UK by a British fan, in 1984 Robinson began a series of tours which were so successful that he took early retirement from his engineering job to turn to a full-time career in music, appearing with established British jazz musicians such as fellow tenor Dick Morrissey, pianist Bill Le Sage, bassist Alec Dankworth and drummer Bill Eyden, among others.

Throughout the rest of the 1980s and into the early 1990s, he played at clubs and festivals throughout the UK, Europe and in various parts of the US, making his New York debut at Christmas 1990. A succession of albums, most as leader but some with artists such as Louis Stewart, Harry Edison, Al Cohn, Roy Williams and Claude Tissendier, attracted high critical and public praise.

Despite his bebop beginnings, the mature musician who emerged in the 1980s from self-imposed exile was a consummate ballad player who explored the endless archives of the Great American Songbook. His rhapsodic, breathy style is instantly identifiable and the effortless loping swing of everything he played. In the early 1990s, Robinson was touring extensively from a UK base, recording many albums and headlining at clubs and festivals in Europe and the USA. He moved to England in 1989. He died in Writtle, Essex on October 29, 2001.

Playing style
"Robinson's playing was characterised by a mellow tone, unaggressive approach and a deep affinity with the classic American song. Broadly speaking, he was one of that school of tenor saxophonists who followed in the wake of Lester Young, players such as Stan Getz and Zoot Sims, but he had developed his own highly engaging voice within that style."

Other work
Robinson provided the voice of Brother Marcus in Grand Theft Auto (1997).

Discography
 At Chesters Volume 1 (Hep, 1984)
 At Chesters Volume 2 (Hep, 1984)
 The Gershwin Collection (Hep, 1987)
 Live at the Bull – Tribute Vols. 1–2 (Bull's Head Music, 1987–88)
 Three for the Road (Hep, 1989)
 Stairway to the Stars (Hep, 1990)
 Spike Robinson and George Masso Play Arlen (Hep, 1991)
 Plays Harry Warren (Hep, 1981–93)
 The CTS Session (Hep, 1998)
 Young Lions Old Tigers (Hep, 2000)
 I Wish I Knew'' - Live in Dublin 1979. The Ralph O'Callaghan Collection. 2007 Nagel Heyer Records.

Main source:

References

1930 births
2001 deaths
American jazz saxophonists
American male saxophonists
Musicians from Kenosha, Wisconsin
20th-century American saxophonists
20th-century American male musicians
American male jazz musicians
Hep Records artists
Discovery Records artists
Concord Records artists